Modern Marvels is an American worldwide television series that formerly aired on the History Channel and is currently shown on Story Television. The program focuses on how technologies affect and are used in modern society. It is  History's first and longest-running program. It was first aired on A&E on December 10, 1992 under the banner "Time Machine." The series began airing on the History Channel in 1995 under its current title.

Introduction
Distinct from other History Channel series, the introduction of Modern Marvels features visuals and sounds of a bolt being turned by a ratchet wrench, followed by a partially computer-generated sequence involving construction workers building and hanging the title.

Production
Bruce Nash is credited with creating the series. Don Cambou acted as executive producer on more than 350 episodes for Actuality Productions, the production company behind the series.

Modern Marvels has produced over 650 one-hour episodes topics that include science, technology, electronics, mechanics, engineering, architecture, industry, mass production, manufacturing, and agriculture. Each episode typically discusses the history and production of several related items. For instance, an episode on distilled spirits discusses the production of bourbon in Kentucky, scotch whisky in Scotland, and tequila in Mexico. To fit the network's format, Modern Marvels focuses a significant portion of the episode on the history of the subject.

The show premiered new episodes in January 2010, not having done so through all of 2009. In August 2010, History Channel began to air older episodes that had been edited to fit a 30-minute time slot, under the title Modern Marvels: Essentials.

In October 2011, Modern Marvels began airing first-run episodes on History 2 (formerly History International) in addition to its main run on History Channel.

Reruns of the series air on the digital broadcast networks Quest and Story Television. The series can also be found on YouTube.

On January 14, 2021, revival of the series was announced; it premiered on History February 21, 2021.

Narration
Modern Marvels has had several narrators. The last and longest-running is Max Raphael, who also narrated other History Channel series such as Command Decisions.

The History Channel repackaged some episodes that originally aired in other series and stand-alone specials into episodes of Modern Marvels, such as Ice Road Truckers, which originally aired in 2000 as part of the series Suicide Missions. These episodes are not narrated by Raphael.

Former Man vs. Food host Adam Richman hosts the 2021 revival.

Engineering Disasters

Occasionally, Modern Marvels aired a special spin-off called Engineering Disasters. These periodic episodes describe the circumstances of situations in which technology does not work correctly, such as building collapses and airplane crashes, resulting in spectacular (and sometimes fatal) failures. Including an episode on New Orleans and another on the 1970s, 24 original Engineering Disasters episodes have been on Modern Marvels. The packaging on the box set of Engineering Disasters 4-20 plus New Orleans describes the series as such: "Dark clouds with silver linings, Modern Marvels: Engineering Disasters presents the tragic, yet invaluable, handmaidens of technological progress."

Episodes

References

External links

Documentary television series about industry
Documentary television series about science
History (American TV channel) original programming
1995 American television series debuts
2015 American television series endings

1990s American documentary television series
2000s American documentary television series
2010s American documentary television series
2020s American documentary television series
American television series revived after cancellation